Operation Abanadela was a military operation launched by the Portuguese Armed Forces in Mozambique during the Mozambican War of Independence against FRELIMO guerrillas in July 1970. designates a set of patrols carried out along the Zambezi River in Mozambique between 20 and 30 July 1970 in order to protect the construction of the Cahora Bassa dam from possible attacks the guerrillas of FRELIMO and the passage of these to the south towards Tete. The Portuguese patrols were carried out by small groups of soldiers from the Portuguese Marine Corps.

References

Mozambican War of Independence
Abanadela
Portuguese Colonial War
Abanadela